The following is a list of county roads in Lake County, Florida.  All county roads are maintained by the county in which they reside.

County routes in Lake County

References

General Highway Map; Lake County, Florida (Florida Department of Transportation)
FDOT GIS data, accessed January 2014

 
County